The 2020–21 Liga MX Femenil season was the fourth season of the premier women's football league in Mexico. The season began on 13 August 2020 and finished on 31 May 2021, albeit behind closed doors because of the COVID-19 pandemic.

Teams, stadiums, and personnel
After Tiburonas Rojas's disaffiliation at the end of the Apertura 2019 as well as the Monarcas Morelia's franchise change to Mazatlán F.C., the league returned to 18 teams.

Stadiums and locations

Alternate venues
 América – Cancha Centenario No. 5 (Capacity: 1,000)
 Atlas – Estadio Colomos Alfredo 'Pistache' Torres (Capacity: 3,000)
 Guadalajara – Verde Valle (Capacity: 800)
 Monterrey – El Barrial (Capacity: 570)
 Toluca – Instalaciones Metepec (Capacity: 1,000)
 UANL – Instalaciones Zuazua (Capacity: 800)
 UNAM – La Cantera (Capacity: 2,000)

Personnel and kits

Format
The Liga MX Femenil season is split into two championships: the Torneo Guardianes 2020 (opening tournament) and the Torneo Guardianes 2021 (closing tournament). Each is contested in an identical format and includes the same eighteen teams.

Since 2019–20 season the teams compete in a single group, the best eight of the general table are classified to the championship playoffs.

Changes
This season witnessed the debut of Mazatlán F.C., the team that replaced Monarcas Morelia after the franchise's relocation to Mazatlán, Sinaloa.
During the hiatus caused by the pandemic, the league saw five coaching changes. Carla Rossi left Tijuana to coach for Querétaro. Frankie Oviedo replaced her as head coach of the Xolas. Édgar Mejía now heads the Chivas, while Rigoberto Esparza leads Atlético San Luis. Miguel Javid Hernández is Mazatlán's inaugural coach.

Torneo Guardianes 2020
The 2020 Torneo Guardianes is the first tournament of the season. The tournament was renamed Torneo Guardianes 2020 (stylized as Guard1anes) in honor of the job healthcare workers have done during the COVID-19 pandemic in Mexico. The tournament began on 13 August 2020.

Regular season

Standings

Positions by Round

Results
Each team plays once all other teams in 17 rounds regardless of it being a home or away match.

Regular Season statistics

Top goalscorers 
Players sorted first by goals scored, then by last name.

Source:Liga MX Femenil

Hat-tricks 

(H) – Home ; (A) – Away

Liguilla
The eight best teams play two games against each other on a home-and-away basis. The higher seeded teams play on their home field during the second leg. The winner of each match up is determined by aggregate score. In the quarterfinals and semifinals, if the two teams are tied on aggregate and on away goals, the higher seeded team advances. In the final, if the two teams are tied after both legs, the match goes to extra time and, if necessary, a penalty shoot-out.

Quarter-finals
The first legs were played on 27 November, and the second legs were played on 30 November 2020.

First leg

Second leg

Semi-finals
The first legs were played on 4 December, and the second legs were played on 7 December 2020.

First leg

Second leg

Final
The first leg was played on 11 December, and the second leg was played on 14 December 2020.

First leg

Second leg

Torneo Guardianes 2021
The Torneo Guardianes 2021 is the second tournament of the season. The tournament was renamed Torneo Guardianes Clausura 2021 (stylized as Guard1anes) in honor of the job healthcare workers have done during the COVID-19 pandemic in Mexico. The tournament began on 7 January 2021.

Regular season

Standings

Positions by Round

Results
Each team plays once all other teams in 17 rounds regardless of it being a home or away match.

Regular Season statistics

Top goalscorers 
Players sorted first by goals scored, then by last name.

Source:Liga MX Femenil

Hat-tricks 

(H) – Home ; (A) – Away

Attendance

Highest and lowest

Source: Liga MX Femenil

Liguilla 
The eight best teams play two games against each other on a home-and-away basis. The higher seeded teams play on their home field during the second leg. The winner of each match up is determined by aggregate score. In the quarterfinals and semifinals, if the two teams are tied on aggregate and on away goals, the higher seeded team advances. In the final, if the two teams are tied after both legs, the match goes to extra time and, if necessary, a penalty shoot-out.

Quarter-finals
The first legs will be played on 7 May, and the second legs were played on 10 May 2021.

First leg

Second leg

Semi-finals
The first legs will be played on 14 May, and the second legs will be played on 17 May 2021.

First leg

Second leg

Final
The first leg was be played on 24 May, and the second leg was played on 31 May 2021.

First leg

Second leg

Campeón de Campeones
On May 24, 2021, the Liga MX Owners Assembly made official the creation of the "Champion of Women's Champions", a tournament between the two winning teams of the season's tournaments made with the goal of premiering the best team in all the annual cycle of Mexican women's football.

This season the tournament was not played because UANL won the two championships that were played in the year.

References

Liga MX Femenil
Mexico
2020–21 in Mexican football